Texas abortion statute (or statutes) may refer to one of these laws enacted by the Texas Legislature in the U.S. state of Texas:

 Texas abortion statutes (1961), portions of the 1961 Texas Penal Code which were held to be unconstitutional in the U.S. Supreme Court case Roe v. Wade (decided 1973)
 Texas Heartbeat Act, effective September 1, 2021, banning abortions after six weeks of pregnancy